Long intergenic non-protein coding RNA 173 is a protein that in humans is encoded by the LINC00173 gene.

References

Further reading